Chattahoochee Hills (formerly Chattahoochee Hill Country) is a city in southern Fulton County, Georgia, United States. The population in 2019 was estimated to 3,318 in an area of approximately  acres after subsequent annexations. Unlike the rest of metro Atlanta, it is still relatively undeveloped, and most of its rural character remains unchanged. The majority of the wider area comprises the west-southwest part of southern Fulton, and smaller adjacent parts of southern Douglas, eastern Carroll, and northern Coweta counties.

History
The area that is now southwest Fulton was originally Campbell County, but it agreed to annexation by neighboring Fulton County on January 1, 1932, to reduce administrative costs.

Historically, much of the west/center of the current city was considered the town of Rico, with other communities, including Goodes, Rivertown, County Line, Campbellton, Pumpkintown, and several other historic communities also within the new city's boundaries.

The idea of "Chattahoochee Hills" is very recent. This developed from attempts to incorporate all of Fulton County into cities following the 2005 incorporation of Sandy Springs in the north part of the county, as well as local efforts to take control of zoning and land subdivision in the multi-county Chattahoochee Hill Country area.

During the 2006 session, the Georgia General Assembly passed a law allowing the Fulton section of the area to incorporate as a city (the only type of municipality allowed in Georgia), the purpose being the municipalization of that county, and to allow local residents to have local control of zoning, with the goal of preserving as much as possible of the rural character of the community while controlling development. Originally, this was to be implemented by concentrating the majority of the development in three planned villages. The nearby city of Palmetto annexed one of the village sites, leaving a gerrymander-looking arm of Palmetto sticking northwest into the heart of the new city.

On June 19, 2007, residents voted by an 83% to 17% margin in a local referendum to incorporate the  portion within Fulton as the city of "Chattahoochee Hill Country". Later annexation could incorporate the portions remaining in other counties.

Chattahoochee Hill Country became a city on December 1, 2007, with the first elected officials taking office a few days later. On September 23, 2008, the city was renamed by an ordinance as "Chattahoochee Hills".

Subsequent zoning updates have maintained the vision of preservation, but have decoupled the development from specific landowner sites. The end result foreseen by the zoning will permanently protect 70% of the City's land as forest and farm, while consolidating the development on the balance of the City's territory in a variety of hamlet, village and town typologies scattered throughout the preserved land, developed on a 'first come/first served' basis. Land will be conserved through a variety of methods, including preservation internal to developments, as well as external preservation through the sale and purchase of Transferable development rights (TDR's).

In 2014 the City responded to community petitions by annexing approximately 5,473 acres to its north along with several hundred residents (from the unincorporated portion of Fulton County), an area which included the original county seat of historic Campbell County, Campbellton.

In 2014 the City also annexed approximately 180 acres with no residents in Coweta County at the request of the developer of Serenbe, who had property in both counties.

Demographics

2020 census

As of the 2020 United States census, there were 2,950 people, 1,106 households, and 786 families residing in the city.

2010 census
As of the census of 2010, there were 2,378 people, 941 households, and 679 families residing in the city. There were 1,080 housing units at an average density of 21.6 per square mile (8.34/km2). The racial makeup of the city was 68.6% White, 28.0% African American, 0.2% Native American, 0.3% Asian, 1.9% from other races, and 1.0% from two or more races. Hispanic or Latino of any race were 5.6% of the population.

There were 941 households, out of which 24.2% had children under the age of 18 living with them, 55.3% were married couples living together, 12.9% had a female householder with no husband present, and 27.8% were non-families. 29.0% of all households were made up of individuals under 18, and 29.1% had someone living alone who was 65 years of age or older. The average household size was 2.53 and the average family size was 2.95.

The population was spread out, with 39.6% under the age of 18, 3.3% from 18 to 21, 56.4% from 22 to 64, and 16.1% who were 65 years of age or older. The median age was 45.8 years.

Recent annexations have added territory and population, which will be reflected in the 2020 census.
The estimated population as of 2017 is 2,903, living in 1,201 households.

References 

Chattahoochee Hill Country Becomes a City, Fulton County Government website

External links 
 
Chattahoochee Hill Country Conservancy

Cities in Georgia (U.S. state)
Chattahoochee Hills
Cities in Fulton County, Georgia
Populated places established in 2007
Georgia populated places on the Chattahoochee River